Pir Kuh-e Olya (also Romanized as Pīr Kūh-e ‘Olyā; also known as Bīr Kūh, Pīrakuh, Pīr Kūh, and Pīr Kūt) is a village in Pir Kuh Rural District, Deylaman District, Siahkal County, Gilan Province, Iran. At the 2006 census, its population was 661, in 201 families.

References 

Populated places in Siahkal County